Black earth, black land or dark earth may refer to:

Places
 Black Earth (town), Wisconsin, a town in the U.S. state of Wisconsin
 Black Earth, Wisconsin, a village in the U.S. state of Wisconsin
 Black Earth, Wisconsin (Potawatomi village), a former Native American village in the U.S. state of Wisconsin
 Central Black Earth economic region, one of 12 economic regions of Russia
 Central Black Earth Region, of Central Russia

Archaeology
 Black Earth, the archaeology site at Carrier Mills, Illinois, United States, that was discovered before the strip mining
 Dark earth, or black earth, a British archaeological horizon
 Terramare, or Black Earth, a technology complex of north Italy

Arts, entertainment, and media

Fictional entities
 Black Earth, the Sindarin translation of Mordor, a fictional location in J. R. R. Tolkien's universe of Middle-earth
 Black Earth areas 1 and 2, in the Mega Man Battle Network 4 Blue Moon and Red Sun versions

Music
Black Earth, a group comprising current and ex-members of Arch Enemy, named after the 1996 Arch Enemy album 
 Black Earth (Arch Enemy album), a 1996 album by the Swedish melodic death metal band Arch Enemy
 Black Earth (Bohren & der Club of Gore album), a 2002 album by the German ambient jazz band Bohren & Der Club of Gore
 Black Earth, an album by Turkish pianist Fazıl Say

Other uses in arts, entertainment, and media
 Black Earth: The Holocaust as History and Warning, a 2015 book by historian Timothy D. Snyder
 Black Earth Rising, a 2018 television drama series
 Dark Earth (video game), a 1997 post-apocalyptic adventure game
 Black Earth (film), a 1923 German silent film

Soil science
 Black earth, the original meaning of chernozem, a type of humus-rich soil
 Black earth, the English translation of the Portuguese terra preta, or terra prêta do índio, very dark soils found in the Amazon Basin

See also
 Black soil  (disambiguation)
 Blacklands  (disambiguation)